Stringtown is an incorporated community in Center Township, Boone County, in the U.S. state of Indiana.

History
The community was likely named for a string of lies made from Dover .

Geography

References

Populated places in Boone County, Indiana